Cory Kenyon and Corey Keaton are pseudonyms used by Mary Tate Engels and Vicki Lewis Thompson, two American writers who wrote collaboratively.

Bibliography

As Cory Kenyon

Single Novels
Sheer Delight (1986)
Fortune Hunter (1986)
Ruffled Feathers (1986)
The Quintessential Woman (1987)
Fancy Footwork (1987)

As Corey Keaton

Single Novel
The Nesting Instinct (1989)

References

Harlequin Enterprises Ltd

American romantic fiction writers
20th-century pseudonymous writers
Pseudonymous women writers
Collective pseudonyms
Writing duos